Creedmoor is a city in , Texas, United States. The population was 202 at the 2010 census.

Geography

Creedmoor is located at  (30.092094, –97.741954), about 15 miles south of Austin.

According to the United States Census Bureau, the city has a total area of 2.1 square miles (5.4 km2), all of it land.

Demographics

As of the census of 2000, there were 211 people, 82 households, and 52 families residing in the city. The population density was 100.8 people per square mile (39.0/km2). There were 89 housing units at an average density of 42.5 per square mile (16.4/km2). The racial makeup of the city was 79.62% White, 0.95% African American, 16.59% from other races, and 2.84% from two or more races. Hispanic or Latino of any race were 47.39% of the population.

There were 82 households, out of which 29.3% had children under the age of 18 living with them, 48.8% were married couples living together, 11.0% had a female householder with no husband present, and 35.4% were non-families. 30.5% of all households were made up of individuals, and 13.4% had someone living alone who was 65 years of age or older. The average household size was 2.57 and the average family size was 3.30.

In the city, the population was spread out, with 23.2% under the age of 18, 5.7% from 18 to 24, 30.8% from 25 to 44, 25.1% from 45 to 64, and 15.2% who were 65 years of age or older. The median age was 39 years. For every 100 females, there were 93.6 males. For every 100 females age 18 and over, there were 88.4 males.

The median income for a household in the city was $39,688, and the median income for a family was $41,875. Males had a median income of $38,250 versus $28,958 for females. The per capita income for the city was $15,143. About 1.7% of families and 4.1% of the population were below the poverty line, including none of those under the age of eighteen and 17.6% of those 65 or over.

Education

The City of Creedmoor is served by the Del Valle Independent School District. Creedmoor Elementary School is the newest elementary school in the district, and it has the largest attendance boundary of any district school. Aside from that school, Ojeda Middle School, Del Valle High School also serves the city.

References

External links

 

Cities in Texas
Cities in Travis County, Texas
Cities in Greater Austin